Garven is a surname. Notable people with the surname include:

Pierre P. Garven, New Jersey Supreme Court judge
Kate Garven, Australian actress
Pierre P. Garven (mayor), New Jersey mayor
James Garven, American finance professor and author

See also
Jock Garven Blackwood
Joseph L. Garvens, Wisconsin politician